Balik may refer to:
 Balik (name)
 Balik (ruler) (died 1347), Bulgarian

Toponyms:
 Balik, Azerbaijan
 Balik, Iran
 Balık, lake in Turkey

See also 
 Balyk (disambiguation)